Young Kim (Korean 김영) (born 2 February 1980) is a South Korean professional golfer.

Kim was born in Chunchon, South Korea. She played on the LPGA of Korea Tour winning five times between 1999 and 2003. She won once on the Futures Tour in 2001. She played on the LPGA Tour from 2003 to 2009, winning the 2007 LPGA Corning Classic.

Kim's best ever finish in a major championship was a T3 at the 2005 Women's British Open.

Kim was second to Lorena Ochoa for Rookie of the Year in 2003. She is perhaps best known for her different hat wear. Kim, when asked to describe the headgear she was wearing, called it a 'bucket hat'.

Professional wins (8)

LPGA Tour wins (1)

Futures Tour wins (1)
2001 Barona Creek Women's Golf Classic

LPGA of Korea Tour wins (5)
1999 Korea Women's Open
2002 Paradise Ladies Open, SBS Super Tournament
2003 KLPGA Championship, SBS Super Tournament

LPGA of Japan Tour wins (1)
2013 Nichi-Iko Women's Open Golf Tournament

Results in LPGA majors

WD = withdrew
CUT = missed the halfway cut
"T" = tied

Summary
Starts – 26
Wins – 0
2nd-place finishes – 0
3rd-place finishes – 1
Top 3 finishes – 1
Top 5 finishes – 1
Top 10 finishes – 6
Top 25 finishes – 11
Missed cuts – 4
Most consecutive cuts made – 7
Longest streak of top-10s – 2 (twice)

Team appearances
Professional
Lexus Cup (representing Asia team): 2006 (winners)
World Cup (representing South Korea): 2007

References

External links

Biography on seoulsisters.com

South Korean female golfers
LPGA Tour golfers
LPGA of Korea Tour golfers
1980 births
Living people